Fish Hooky is a 1933 Our Gang short comedy film directed by Robert F. McGowan. It was the 120th (32nd talking episode) Our Gang short that was released.

Plot
Wheezer, Dickie, Uh-huh, and Stymie choose to play hooky from school again to go fishing with Joe and Farina. Meanwhile, Miss Kornman is taking her students to the beach and amusement pier free of charge. Spanky and Cotton deliver sick notes forged for Dickie, Stymie, and Wheezer by Joe and Farina to Miss Kornman, stating why they were absent. Truant officer Mickey Daniels decides to teach the boys a lesson.

The truant officer then lectures the boys about what they can expect if sent to reform school (at Christmas, he claims that "everybody gets a brand new sledgehammer!"), and frightens them so much they insist on being taken to the beach to apologize to Miss Kornman. En route, Stymie spots the truant officer badge and the boys flee. The officer purposely makes the chase long, but eventually catches all the boys. They beg Miss Kornman to stop Mr. Daniels from locking the boys in a reform school. She does after the boys promise to never play hooky again.

Afterwards, Mr. Daniels asks Miss Kornman for a kiss, but she refuses. As he keeps on begging her, Spanky (who was taking a nap) shouts: "For the love of Pete! Kiss him so I can go to sleep!"

Cast

The Gang
 Matthew Beard as Stymie
 Dorothy DeBorba as Dorothy
 Bobby Hutchins as Wheezer Hutchins
 George McFarland as Spanky
 Dickie Moore as Dickie Moore
 Bobbie Beard as Cotton
 John Collum as Uh-huh
 Pete the Pup as himself

Additional cast
 Joe Cobb as Joe
 Mickey Daniels as Mickey Daniels
 Allen Hoskins as Farina
 Mary Kornman as Mary Kornman
 Donald Haines as First kid in class
 Baldwin Cooke as Amusement park barker
 Bobby De War as School kid
 Henry Hanna as School kid
 Mildred Kornman as School kid

Note
Fish Hooky marks cameo appearances of four former Our Gangers, now teenagers. Allen Hoskins (Farina, aged 12) and Joe Cobb (aged 15) play the "older kids" who the Gang follows to the fishing hole. Mary Kornman (teacher) and Mickey Daniels (truant officer) portray adult roles, despite them both being the teenagers as well (Mickey 18, Mary 16).

This also marked the final appearance of recurring player Donald Haines.

The Fishing scenes were filmed on Ballona Creek in Culver City.

The amusement park scenes were filmed at the Venice Amusement Pier and show the rides and attractions ca. 1933.

See also
 Our Gang filmography

References

External links
 
 

1933 films
1933 comedy films
American black-and-white films
Films directed by Robert F. McGowan
Hal Roach Studios short films
Our Gang films
1933 short films
1930s American films